Crathorne is a village and civil parish in the Hambleton District of North Yorkshire, England. The parish population was 172 at the 2011 census. The River Leven flows through the parish. The A19 used to run through the village before a dual carriageway was built in 1975.  Now the A67 follows the route of the old A19 north towards Yarm.

The village is the ancestral home of the Crathorne family, dating back to Sir William de Crathorne, knighted by Edward II in 1327. The village is now home to James Dugdale, 2nd Baron Crathorne, whose family purchased the Crathorne estate in 1844, and rebuilt Crathorne Hall in 1906, owning it until 1977. The hall is now a country house hotel owned by Hand Picked Hotels.

The village is also home to Crathorne Cricket Club, which plays its cricket in the Langbaurgh League Second Division.

References

External links
Crathorne village website. Retrieved 21 November 2011
The Crathorne Family History Site. Retrieved 21 November 2011

Villages in North Yorkshire
Civil parishes in North Yorkshire